Brodiaea nana is a species of plant in the subfamily Brodiaeoideae. It is endemic to the Sierra Nevada.

References

nana
Endemic flora of the United States
Flora without expected TNC conservation status